Nowe Drezdenko railway station is a railway station serving the towns of Drezdenko and Strzelce Krajeńskie, in the Lubusz Voivodeship, Poland. The station opened in 1857 and is located on the Tczew–Kostrzyn railway. The train services are operated by PKP, Przewozy Regionalne and Arriva.

Train services
The station is served by the following service(s):

Intercity services Gorzow Wielkopolski - Krzyz - Pila - Bydgoszcz - Torun - Kutno - Lowicz - Warsaw
Intercity services Gorzow Wielkopolski - Krzyz - Poznan - Ostrow Wielkopolski - Lubliniec - Czestochowa - Krakow
Intercity services (TLK) Gdynia Główna — Kostrzyn 
Regional services (R) Kostrzyn - Gorzow Wielkopolski - Krzyz (- Poznan)

References

 This article is based upon a translation of the Polish language version as of November 2016.

External links

Railway stations in Poland opened in 1857
Railway stations in Lubusz Voivodeship
1857 establishments in Prussia